This glossary of philosophy is a list of definitions of terms and concepts relevant to philosophy and related disciplines, including logic, ethics, and theology.

A

B

C

 sentience or awareness of internal and external existence.

D

E

F

G

H

I

J

K

L

M

N

O

P

Q

R

S

T

U

V

W

Y

Z

See also

 Outline of philosophy
 List of philosophies
 Index of philosophy
 List of thought processes

References

External links

 The Ism Book: A Field Guide to Philosophy
 Stanford Encyclopedia of Philosophy
 Internet Encyclopedia of Philosophy
 Philosophical dictionary
 Internet philosophy guide
 Philosophy Primer 
 Philosophy terms
 Formal glossary of philosophy on Wikiversity

 
Glossary of philosophy terms
Glossary of philosophy terms
Wikipedia glossaries using description lists